The Border Star was a newspaper published in Coolangatta, Queensland, Australia from 1927 to 1942, with its final issue appearing on 30 January.

This newspaper has been digitised and is available on Trove.

References 

Defunct newspapers published in Queensland
Coolangatta